Agronus is a genus of broad-nosed weevils in the beetle family Curculionidae. There are at least three described species in Agronus.

Species
These three species belong to the genus Agronus:
 Agronus carri Buchanan, 1929 i c g b
 Agronus cinerarius Horn, 1876 i c g
 Agronus deciduus Horn, 1876 i c g
Data sources: i = ITIS, c = Catalogue of Life, g = GBIF, b = Bugguide.net

References

Further reading

 
 
 
 

Entiminae
Articles created by Qbugbot